The 1927 Southend by-election was a parliamentary by-election for the British House of Commons constituency of Southend, Essex, on 19 November 1927.

Previous MP 
The Conservative MP, Rupert Guinness, Viscount Elveden succeeded his father as Earl of Iveagh and took a seat in the House of Lords, vacating his seat in the House of Commons. He had represented the seat and its predecessor since 1912 and the area had not returned any other party since the Liberals won in 1906.

Previous Result

Candidates 
The Conservatives chose the former MP's wife, 46-year-old Gwendolen Guinness, now titled the Countess of Iveagh to defend the seat. 
The Liberal candidate was 33-year-old Hon. Dougall Meston. He was a former soldier who had become a Barrister in 1924. He was the heir to Baron Meston. This was his first election as a candidate.
Labour selected a new candidate in James Erskine Harper.
A fourth candidate entered the contest in the figure of a 52-year-old Manchester baker, E.A. Hailwood. He put himself forward as a candidate protesting against Baldwin's lack of leadership as Prime Minister.

Result 

Harper(Labour) and Hailwood (Ind. Unionist) lost their deposits.

Aftermath 
Hailwood went on to contest a further two by-elections as an Independent Conservative. Labour chose not to contest the seat at the following General Election.

References
 British Parliamentary Election Results 1918-1949, compiled and edited by F.W.S. Craig (The Macmillan Press 1979)

1927 in England
1927 elections in the United Kingdom
Politics of Southend-on-Sea
By-elections to the Parliament of the United Kingdom in Essex constituencies
1920s in Essex